China Classification Society (CCS; 中國船級社) is a classification society of ships, started in 1956 as a non-profit making body in the People's Republic of China to perform classification survey, certification survey and notarial survey of ships including offshore installations, containers and related industrial products both at home and abroad. CCS also conduct statutory work on behalf of the Chinese Government and other flag administrations.

CCS joined the International Association of Classification Societies (IACS) as a full member in May 1988.

References

External links
CCS China Classification Society

Ship classification societies